Arrade erebusalis is a moth of the family Erebidae first described by Francis Walker in 1863. It is found in Sri Lanka, Nicobar Islands, Singapore, Borneo, New Guinea, Bismarck Islands and Australia.

Forewings medium gray with a strongly angled and very fine, broken, blackish postmedial.

References

Moths of Asia
Moths described in 1863
Erebidae
Hypeninae